A bust of John McDonogh was installed in New Orleans, Louisiana, United States in 1938, as part of the Federal Art Project. It was created by Angela Gregory, a New Orleans native, and was erected at what was designated "McDonogh Place", a small park in Uptown New Orleans at St. Charles Avenue and Toledano Street. In 1958, it was moved to Duncan Plaza by the new City Hall. The artwork was surveyed by the Smithsonian Institution's "Save Outdoor Sculpture!" program in 1993.

The sculpture was torn down by protesters on June 13, 2020, and rolled into the Mississippi River. The mayor of New Orleans, LaToya Cantrell, condemned the act on Twitter, calling it "unlawful". The bust was retrieved from the river a couple days later, and returned it to city officials.

See also
 List of monuments and memorials removed during the George Floyd protests

References

External links

 

1938 sculptures
Busts in the United States
Monuments and memorials in Louisiana
Monuments and memorials removed during the George Floyd protests
Outdoor sculptures in Louisiana
Relocated buildings and structures in Louisiana
Sculptures of men in Louisiana